The following is a list of ecoregions in Ivory Coast, according to the Worldwide Fund for Nature (WWF).

Terrestrial ecoregions
By major habitat type:

Tropical and subtropical moist broadleaf forests

Eastern Guinean forests
Guinean montane forests
Western Guinean lowland forests

Tropical and subtropical grasslands, savannas, and shrublands

Guinean forest-savanna mosaic
West Sudanian savanna

Mangrove

Guinean mangroves

Freshwater ecoregions
By bioregion:

Nilo-Sudan

Ashanti (Ghana)
Eburneo
Upper Niger
Volta

Upper Guinea
Mount Nimba
Southern Upper Guinea

Marine ecoregions

Gulf of Guinea

 
Ivory Coast geography-related lists
Ivory Coast